Pericallis echinata is a species of flowering plant in the family Asteraceae. It is native to Tenerife in the Canary Islands.

Description
The leaves are rounded in shape, with toothed margins.

Distribution and habitat
Pericallis echinata is endemic to the Canary Islands. It is found in the north-west of Tenerife. On the north coast, large numbers of plants may be found locally in Cistus scrub and on rocky slopes. It is found much less often in the south of the island.

References

echinata
Endemic flora of the Canary Islands